Southampton Heliport  is a heliport in the village of Southampton, New York.

Operations
Southampton Heliport is located at 2075 Meadow Lane near the western end of the peninsula. It is used in the summer by the wealthy to travel from Manhattan to their summer homes in The Hamptons.

References

External links
Southampton Village Heliport

Airports in Suffolk County, New York
Heliports in New York (state)